PolArt is an arts festival that celebrates the Polish cultural heritage of Polish Australians and New Zealanders by presenting the Polish arts. The festival is held every three years in a different state capital in Australia with the first being held in 1975. Events that take place during PolArt cover the artistic disciplines of dance, literature, music, theatre and visual arts. Wellington hosts the next PolArt Festival, commencing 2025.

Overview of PolArt Festival 
In the three years leading up to a festival, the host city establishes an organising committee, raises funds, prepares the program and facilitates the logistics for participating artists. The festival starts in late December and runs into January to allow participants the best opportunity to attend. Approximately 1000 artists and entourage travel from around Australia and New Zealand to gather in the host city. Behind the scenes, participants have full cast rehearsals and social events throughout the festival. Tens of thousands, even hundreds of thousands of members of the public will attend festival events. Events are predominantly located in the heart of the host city for maximum accessibility and to be prominent in the host city’s entertainment calendar. Past festivals have featured events at iconic venues including the Sydney Opera House, Arts Centre Melbourne and Queensland Performing Arts Centre. Over the two weeks of the PolArt festival, there is a diverse range of events across all featured art disciplines.

Overview of Arts

Folkloric Dancing 
Polish Folk songs and dances form a distinctive unit within the wider field of international folklore and have evolved from ancient observations and traditions. The variety of Polish folkloric dances are a result of the characteristics of each region in Poland, such as environment and socio-economic status. Although they all have similar rhythms, they are unique throughout the different clothing and choreography due to the characteristics of each region. During PolArt, concerts are held, usually at notable venues, to showcase these folk dances from the different regions. Various folkloric dance groups from around Australia and New Zealand perform at these festivals with their repertoires. There are also folkloric workshops that the public can attend that can range from making a flower wreath (a ‘wianek’, typically worn as a headdress in folkloric dances) to learning the basics of folk dances.

Literature 
Polish literature has a long and rich history not limited to the Polish language, spanning the full range of works across poetry, plays, dramas, letters, essays, historical accounts and more. These at times played a significant role in maintaining Polish identity and culture, such as the works of Adam Mickiewicz during the Partitions of Poland, and continue to feature prominently in the lives of people of Polish heritage. PolArt extends this to literature from local authors influenced by Polish culture, and shares this appreciation with all interested Australians and New Zealanders through book clubs, seminars, author panels and meet & greet functions.

Art 
Art in Polish culture has evolved from pagan roots and incorporated a multiplicity of cultural influences by virtue of Poland being a trading crossroads for centuries that welcomed and integrated people of diverse cultures to its society. In contemporary art, Polish artists have played integral roles in the development of art forms such as murals by Nespoon and neons throughout the Cold War era that are preserved at a dedicated museum in Warsaw. Artworks are showcased throughout PolArt, whether at exhibitions in galleries or in public spaces. These artworks are created by Australian and New Zealand artists influenced by Polish culture and/or heritage. The exhibitions typically run throughout the duration of the festival but on occasion extend beyond the core festival dates to provide more viewing opportunities for festival visitors.

Theatre 
Dramatic theatre is the staple of Polish theatre, however, other historic forms were notable at times, for example visual theatre that played a role in evading state censorship. Polish actors became renowned across continents, such as Helena Modjeska in both London and the United States. Polish-Australians continue this tradition and PolArt puts on plays and theatre shows throughout each festival. These plays include original pieces and historic items, some in Polish and others in English.

Music 
Polish music has been an art form whose exemplars are world famous, including classical composer Frédéric Chopin, and that have influenced other European cultures such as the Polonaise that was adopted in the court of France. Music in Polish culture is inextricably linked with the national identity. Sir Pawel Edmund Strzelecki, a famed explorer in Australia, felt so connected to his culture through music that he composed Polonaises of his own, that over a century later was discovered and have had dances choreographed to their music. Music at PolArt is presented live in concert and in intimate performances, both traditional and contemporary, by musicians and vocalists from across Australia and New Zealand.

History 
PolArt started out as an initiative of the Federation of Polish Women in Australia and New Zealand, under the leadership of Mrs Zofia Krupska named ArtPol. The vision of the inaugural 1975 festival in Sydney was to celebrate Polish culture in Australia and New Zealand for the first- and second-generation Polish Australians and New Zealanders.
The vision for today’s PolArt festivals remains the same as it was in 1975. In 1980, the second festival was held in Adelaide, South Australia and started the trend of the festival moving to a different state capital with each subsequent festival. Alongside the change of city for the festival in 1980, the name was changed from ArtPol to PolArt and the new name persisted. The organisers of the PolArt Festivals have been predominantly the folkloric song and dance groups as many of these groups have attended all or almost all the PolArt festivals since its inception in 1975, and the majority of art participants at PolArt came from these groups. It was these groups at the end of each festival who would determine which city would host the next PolArt festival. After the conclusion of the 2015 PolArt festival in Melbourne, Victoria, the leaders of the folklore song and dance groups decided to create an enduring association to ensure the PolArt festival could continue to celebrate Polish culture in Australia and New Zealand in collaboration with not only the dance groups but also other artistic organisations.

List of Past Festivals

Total of Hosting Cities 

Wellington will be hosting the next festival in 2025, set to be the first time the festival is hosted in New Zealand.

Long-running Participants

PolArt Inc. 
Polish Visual and Performing Arts in Australia and New Zealand, commonly referred to as PolArt Inc., is an incorporated entity that was established in 2016 for the purpose of supporting the promotion of Polish Culture throughout Australia and New Zealand through PolArt.   The establishment of PolArt Inc. as an independent body ensures that the intellectual property rights and legacy of the PolArt festival continues to belong to the Polish community for years to come. Alongside this, PolArt Inc. helps support the organisation and partial funding of PolArt festivals.

References

External links
PolArt Sydney 2022 Website
Tatry Adelaide - Website
Lowicz Melbourne - Website
Kujawy Sydney - Website
Syrenka Sydney - Website
Wisla Brisbane - Website
Lajkonik Sydney - Website
Obertas Brisbane - Website
Kukułeczka Perth - Website
Orleta Wellington - Polish Community Website
Polonus Christchurch - Polish Community Website
Polonez Melbourne - Website
Oberek Hobart - Polish Association in Hobart Website
Lublin Wellington - Polish Community Website
Podhale Sydney - Website
Wawel Wollongong - Polish Association in Wollongong Website
Wielkopolska Canberra - Polish Council of ACT Website

Australian culture
Polish culture
Polish folklore
Polish-Australian culture
Polish-New Zealand culture